HD 94510 is a single star in the southern constellation of Carina, positioned near the northern constellation border with Vela. It has the Bayer designation u Carinae; HD 94520 is the identifier from the Henry Draper Catalogue. This object has an orange hue and is visible to the naked eye with an apparent visual magnitude that fluctuates around +3.78. The star is located at a distance of 95 light-years from the Sun based on parallax, and is drifting further away with a radial velocity of +8 km/s.

This is a K-type star in the subgiant stage with a stellar classification of K0IV, which indicates it has exhausted the supply of hydrogen at its core and is evolving into a giant. HD 94510 is a suspected variable star with a brightness that has been measured varying from magnitude 3.75 down to 3.80. It has an estimated 1.60 times the mass of the Sun and has expanded to nearly eight times the Sun's radius.

References

K-type subgiants
Carina (constellation)
Carinae, u
Durchmusterung objects
0404.1
094510
053253
4257